Mercy Wanyama is a Kenyan basketball player. She currently plays professionally in Spain.

Early years and education 
Mercy Wanyama was born in 14th January 1992. She is a Langata High School alumnus and Shiners Girls in Nakuru . Mercy school at St.Peters in her lower level classes

Career 
Wanyama represented Kenya Basketball Federation's Women premier league, and has played for the Equity Hawks from 2016 until 2018 where she won the MVP at the national league and the club  qualifiers.She also played for a local club- MTM Storms. In 2018, she signed for ADBA Avilés, a Spanish team.Then later Moved to AD Cortegada LF2 team in Spain where she is currently. In the start if 22-23 season she won the special MVP award after bagging 23points and 12 rebound hitting a high Val of 43. <ref name="DailyNationtoo"

Personal life 
She is the younger sibling of Harambee stars captain Victor Wanyama, and ex-international McDonald Mariga; their father is a former AFC Leopard player.

References 

J.1: Mercy Wanyama, el liderazgo de las 48 horas de la primera gran MVP

Living people
Kenyan women's basketball players
1992 births